Jailangkung, also called jelangkung, is an Indonesian folk ritual of communicating with spirits of the dead.

Jailangkung or Jelangkung may also refer to:

 Jelangkung (film), 2001 Indonesian horror film directed by Rizal Mantovani and Jose Poernomo
 Jelangkung 3, 2007 Indonesian horror film directed by Angga Dwimas Sasongko
 Tusuk Jelangkung di Lubang Buaya, 2018 Indonesian horror film directed by Erwin Arnada
 Jailangkung: Sandekala, 2022 Indonesian horror film directed by Kimo Stamboel